Nancy Silverton (born June 20, 1954) is an American chef, baker, and author. The winner of the James Beard Foundation's Outstanding Chef Award in 2014, Silverton is recognized for her role in popularizing sourdough and artisan breads in the United States.

Early life and education 

Silverton grew up in Sherman Oaks and Encino, in Southern California's San Fernando Valley.  Born into a Jewish family, her mother, Doris, was a writer for the soap opera General Hospital and her father, Larry, was a lawyer. Silverton enrolled at Sonoma State University as a political science major and decided to become a chef in her freshman year after she had what she later described as an epiphany.  "I was cooking in the dorms in a stainless steel kitchen, cooking vegetarian food, and I remember this light bulb went on and I thought, 'Oh wait, this is what I want to do for the rest of my life,' " she said in a 2013 interview.

Silverton dropped out of Sonoma State in her senior year, and decided to train formally as a chef at Le Cordon Bleu in London. In 1979, following her graduation, she returned to Southern California, where she worked with pastry chef Jimmy Brinkeley at Michael's, an acclaimed restaurant in Santa Monica.  Inspired by his creativity, she returned to Europe to attend Ecole Lenotre Culinary Institute in Plasir, France, to further her studies.

Career 

After Silverton returned to Los Angeles in 1982, she was hired by Wolfgang Puck as Spago's opening pastry chef, and in 1986, she wrote her first cookbook, Desserts.

Campanile and La Brea Bakery

In 1989, Silverton, her then-husband, chef, the lateMark Peel, and  Manfred Krankl  opened  Campanile, about which critic Jonathan Gold  would later write: "It is hard to overstate Campanile's contributions to American cooking." Almost as an afterthought, Silverton and Peel opened La Brea Bakery in a space which adjoined the main restaurant; it opened prior to Campanile.  Silverton served as the head baker at the bakery and the head pastry chef at the restaurant, which was located on La Brea Avenue in the Hancock Park area of Los Angeles.

Silverton had limited experience from baking bread while a pastry chef at Spago and began to experiment with recipes after she read an article about a San Francisco artisan bakery, Acme.  She used grapes, which had natural yeast, and let them soak for days in flour and water.  She then mixed the dough, shaped the loaves by hand, and let them rise twice over a two-day period.  After six months and "hundreds" of attempts to perfect the recipe, she was satisfied.  Artisan bread was then largely unknown in Los Angeles, and within weeks, sales were up to $1,000 a day at the bakery.  On Thanksgiving in 1990, the line to buy bread stretched around the block and partway down a side street.

Campanile was equally successful from the start. Silverton and Peel were well known through their work at Spago and Michael's, and Campanile was uniformly lauded by the press.  Reservations were difficult, and during their first year,  annual sales exceeded $2 million.  Silverton would bake bread all night, sleep briefly, wake mid-morning to prepare pastries and desserts for the restaurant, and nap again before dinner. In 1991, she won the James Beard Foundation's Outstanding Pastry Chef award. In an article on the awards, the Los Angeles Times wrote that she had  "not only given Los Angeles great bread, but through her work at Campanile, she has virtually redefined what dessert is."

Silverton, however, was "frazzled." In 1992, she and Krankl went back to the group of investors who had funded Campanile, and built a much larger, fully staffed, commercial bakery.  At the same time, they split the bakery into a separate entity. Silverton became less involved with the bakery in 1993, serving mainly as an advisor.   

In 1996, her second book, Nancy Silverton's Breads from the La Brea Bakery: Recipes for the Connoisseur, was published.

In 1998, Silverton began "Grilled Cheese Night" at Campanile, which became an establishment in Los Angeles.  Described as the "godmother of grilled cheese sandwiches," by NBC's Today Show, "Grilled Cheese Night" started a worldwide trend.  Her book Nancy Silverton's Sandwich Book: The Best Sandwiches Ever--from Thursday Nights at Campanile was published in 2005.

In 2001, an Irish investment group, IAWS, purchased La Brea Bakery for a price that was reported as ranging from $56 million to $68.5 million.  Silverton earned more than $5 million in the sale, and invested with Bernard Madoff; her profits were lost in 2008 with the collapse of his pyramid scheme.   In 2005, she and Peel separated, and Silverton left Campanile after their divorce in 2007. The restaurant closed in October 2012.

Osteria Mozza

In 2007, Silverton partnered with New York chef Mario Batali and his frequent collaborator Joseph Bastianich to open an Italian restaurant, Osteria Mozza.

Four months after the opening of the pizzeria (Pizzeria Mozza), Osteria Mozza opened to similar acclaim.  The restaurant's entire menu was widely praised.

Osteria Mozza later opened restaurants in Newport Beach, California (Pizzeria Mozza), and Singapore.

Silverton won the James Beard Foundation's Outstanding Chef Award in 2014, the Beard Awards' most prestigious honor.

Nancy's Fancy

In June 2015 Silverton launched Nancy's Fancy.  A luxury line of seven flavors of gelato and sorbetto, Nancy's Fancy, is sold in supermarkets. The company's original location was based in Chatsworth, California; however, they have since relocated to a 6,000 square foot warehouse in the Arts District of Downtown, Los Angeles.

Pizzette

Nancy opened a casual Italian restaurant specializing in small pizzas in Fall 2019 located in Culver City, California, called Pizzette.

The Farmhouse at Ojai Valley Inn

Nancy was named Culinary Ambassador of the new Farmhouse food and event space in Ojai, California, in early 2019.

Personal life 

Silverton serves as mentor to the team of pastry chefs at Short Cake Bakery, a bakery she helped her longtime friend, the late Amy Pressman, to open.
 
She has been a member of the Macy's Culinary Council since 2003 and is involved in the Meals on Wheels programs in Chicago, New York, and Los Angeles.

Silverton lost the money she made from the sale of La Brea Bakery in the Madoff investment scandal. She has three children.

Selected awards and distinctions 

Eater's TV Chef of the Year (2017)
Outstanding Chef, James Beard Foundation Award (2014)
International Star Diamond Award for Outstanding Hospitality (2010)
RCA Pioneer Award (2003)
James Beard, nominated for Outstanding Service (2003)
James Beard, nominated for Outstanding Service  (2002)
James Beard Outstanding Restaurant Award, Campanile (2001)
IACP Julia Childs Cookbook Awards Nominee  (1997)
James Beard, Nominee, Best Cookbook of the Year, Baking (1997)
Los Angeles Culinary Master of the Year, The 1994 Fine Spirit Wine & Food Tasting Exhibition (1994)
James Beard "Who's Who in American Cooking" (1990)
James Beard Best Pastry Chef of the Year (1990)
Food & Wine Magazine, Best New Chefs (1990)

Selected appearances 

 In 2017, Silverton was featured on an episode of Chef's Table.
 Silverton was a guest judge on Sugar Rush in 2018.
 Silverton appeared in the "New York City" episode of Somebody Feed Phil.
 Silverton appears often on Top Chef.
 Silverton made an appearance on season seven of MasterChef Junior.
 Silverton has appeared as a judge on Tournament of Champions
 Silverton made an appearance on season 11 of MasterChef.
Silverton made her debut as a judge on Guy's Grocery Games in July, 2021 
Silverton appeared on Hell's Kitchen as a chef's table guest in the Blue Team's kitchen in the episode "Young Guns: Come Hell or High Water!".

Bibliography 

 Desserts.  Harper & Row. .  1986.
Mark Peel & Nancy Silverton at Home: Two Chefs Cook for Family & Friends.  With Mark Peel.  Warner Books. . 1994
Breads from the La Brea Bakery. Villard Books. . 1996
The Food of Campanile: Recipes from the Famed Los Angeles Restaurant.  With Mark Peel. Villard Books. .  1997 
 Nancy Silverton's Pastries from the La Brea Bakery. Villard Books. . 2000.
 Nancy Silverton's Sandwich Book: The Best Sandwiches Ever—from Thursday Nights at Campanile. Knopf. . 2005.
A Twist of the Wrist: Quick Flavorful Meals with Ingredients from Jars, Cans, Bags, and Boxes. Knopf. .  2007.
The Mozza Cookbook: Recipes from Los Angeles's Favorite Italian Restaurant and Pizzeria. With Matt Molina, Carolynn Carreno and Mario Batali. Knopf. . 2011.

References

External links 

 Osteria Mozza 

Living people
American chefs
American bakers
20th-century American Jews
Alumni of Le Cordon Bleu
American women chefs
1954 births
James Beard Foundation Award winners
Head chefs of Michelin starred restaurants
21st-century American Jews
20th-century American women
21st-century American women
Chefs from Los Angeles